Twiki or TWiki may refer to:

 Twiki (robot), in the TV series Buck Rogers in the 25th Century
 TWiki, a Perl-based structured wiki application
 TWIKI.NET, a company that supports TWiki by Rod Beckstrom and Peter Thoeny